Nasi ambeng or Nasi ambang is an Indonesian fragrant rice dish that consists of - but is not limited to - steamed white rice, chicken curry or chicken stewed in soy sauce, beef or chicken rendang, sambal goreng (lit. fried sambal; a mildly spicy stir-fried stew commonly made with firm tofu, tempeh, and long beans) urap, bergedel, and serunding.

It is a popular Javanese cuisine, especially within the Javanese-Malay communities in Singapore and the Malaysian states of Johor and Selangor where they also added fried noodles as additional condiments.

Nasi ambeng is often served communal dining-style on a platter to be shared among four to five people; especially during festive or special occasions such as a kenduri.

See also

Nasi campur
Nasi bakar
Javanese cuisine
Tumpeng

References 

Javanese cuisine
Indonesian rice dishes
Malay cuisine
Malaysian rice dishes